Gorges is a commune in the Somme department in Hauts-de-France in northern France.

Geography

Population

World War II
After the liberation of the area by Allied Forces in 1944, engineers of the Ninth Air Force IX Engineering Command began construction of a combat Advanced Landing Ground outside of the town.  Declared operational on 16 August, the airfield was designated as "A-26", it was used by the 379th Bombardment Group which flew B-26 Marauder medium bombers until early September when the unit moved into Central France.  Afterward, the airfield was closed.

See also
Communes of the Somme department

References

Communes of Somme (department)